Laxman Basnet (born 21 February 1957) is a Nepalese long-distance runner. He competed in the men's 5000 metres at the 1980 Summer Olympics.

References

External links
 

1957 births
Living people
Athletes (track and field) at the 1980 Summer Olympics
Nepalese male long-distance runners
Olympic athletes of Nepal
Place of birth missing (living people)
20th-century Nepalese people